The Aurangabad Industrial City (abbrev. AURIC or Auric) is a greenfield industrial smart city over an area of 10,000 acres in Aurangabad, Maharashtra, India. It is a part of the Delhi–Mumbai Industrial Corridor Project (DMIC), which is planned for developing an industrial zone spanning across six states between India's capital, Delhi and its financial hub, Mumbai. The Government of Maharashtra decided to develop the Shendra and Bidkin neighborhoods of Aurangabad as a planned industrial township under DMIC. Equipped with an underground plug and play infrastructure, 60% of the land in AURIC is for industrial usage, mainly focusing on textile, food, defence, engineering and electronics, while the remaining 40% is intended for residential, commercial and other purposes.

On 7 September 2019, the Aurangabad Industrial City was inaugurated as the first industrial integrated smart city of India under the Government of India's flagship Smart Cities Mission.

Shendra–Bidkin

Shendra

MIDC in the 1990s established the third industrial estate in the city by acquiring 902 hectares of land at Shendra village. Shendra Industrial area is a 5-star industrial estate.  Shendra has located 17 km from Aurangabad on Jalna road towards the east of the city. It is 8.0 km from Aurangabad airport.  The Aurangabad railway station is 19.0 km away. The Shendra Industrial Area is just a 15 mins. drive from the city

Bidkin
Bidkin is a large village in Paithan Taluka of Aurangabad district.
Bidkin village is situated about 24 km from Aurangabad city on Aurangabad - Paithan Highway towards its south. It is located at a distance of 27 km from its Taluka headquarter town of Paithan. According to 2001 census, the population of the village was 14941.

Industrial Park
As part of the DMIC, the Government of Maharashtra has decided to develop the Shendra and Bidkin belt in Aurangabad as planned industrial townships to act as major investment node. The industrial park is being developed from Shendra on the east, up to Bidkin on the south of Aurangabad city.
The Industrial park is to come upon 8400 hectares of land i.e. 20756 acres. Renowned US firm, AECOM, has been roped in as a consultant for planning the township. The state has also decided to rope in a Japanese consortium to recommend the use of technology for infrastructure upgrades in these areas.
Based on the investment potential of an area, the state has plans to develop the Aurangabad belt as an automobile and engineering hub.
 An Exhibition and Convention Center is being developed at Sendra.
Recently the Government of India has announced a New National Manufacturing Policy. Under this policy, seven National Investment and Manufacturing Zones (NIMZ) are proposed to be set up. It aims, setting up of mega industrial towns on waste and infertile land acquired by the government. The Industrial Park would be one of them.

See also
Amritsar Delhi Kolkata Industrial Corridor

References

External links
 www.auric.city - Official website
 Shendra - Bidkin Master Plan - 5 MB approx
 website development | Software Development - website

Economy of Aurangabad, Maharashtra
Industrial parks in India
Smart cities in India
2019 establishments in Maharashtra
Industrial cities